Amar Es (English: To Love Is) is the eighth studio album recorded by Mexican singer-songwriter Cristian Castro. It was released by BMG U.S. Latin on September 30, 2003 (see 2003 in music). This album was produced by Emilio Estefan, Jr., co-produced by Randall M. Barlow, Federico Ehrlich, Roberto Livi and Rudy Pérez. Amar Es, which translates to English as "To Love Is", is notable for its eclectic use of languages and musical styles.  The song "Why", for example, is in English, whilst the single "No Hace Falta" combines Japanese and Latin pop.  On the other hand, tracks such as the successful single "Te Llamé" hold fast to Castro's Latin-pop roots.

Track listing

Credits and personnel 

Pedro Alfonso – Violin
Tommy Anthony – Vocals (Background)
Área 305 – Vocals (Background)
Hiram Arencibia – Trombone
Antonio Baglio – Mastering
Randall M. Barlow – Composer, producer, Programming
Cancio Barretto – Requinto
Juan Ángel Barretto – 	Engineer
Kurt Berge – Technical Support
Richard Bravo – Percussion
Olbin Burgos – Drums
Scott Canto – Engineer
Jorge Casas – Bass
Cristian Castro – Composer
Bill Compton – Composer
Mike Couzzi – Engineer
Sal Cueva – Bass
Kevin Dillon – Production Coordination
Valério Do Carmo – Graphic Design
Vicky Echeverri – Vocals (Background)
Federico Ehrlich – Producer
Fabi Espino – Trumpet
Emilio Estefan, Jr. – Composer, producer, Video Director
Daniela Federici – Photography
Alfredo Galán – Trumpet
Javier Garza – Mixing Engineer
Jessica González – A&R
Courtney Goodwin – Photography
Julio Hernández – Bass
David Heuer – Assistant Engineer
Carlos Infante – Piano
María Teresa Lara – Composer
Leyla Leeming – Production Coordination
Lee Levin – Drums
Gary Lindsay – Arranger
Roberto Livi – Composer, producer
David López – Assistant Engineer
Manny López – Guitar, Guitar (Acoustic)
José Juan Maldonado – Production Coordination
Juan Pablo Manzanero – Composer
Gian Marco – Composer
Steve Menezes – Coordination
Miami Symphonic Strings – Strings
Víctor Miller – Trumpet
Alejandro Montalbán – Composer   
Rickie Muñóz – Trombone
Joel Numa – Engineer, Mixing Engineer
Marco Olan – Bass
Clay Ostwald – Organ, Piano
Mario Patiño – Creative Director, Text
Andy Pechenik – Technical Support
Archie Peña – Percussion
Fernando Perdomo	– Guitar (Electric), Theremin
Betsy Pérez – Project Coordinator
Rudy Pérez – Arranger, composer, director, producer, Vocals (Background)
Clay Perry – Keyboards, Programming
Freddy Piñero, Jr. – Engineer
Daniel Ponce – Assistant Engineer
Adrián Possé – A&R
Óscar G. Regueira – Engineer
Juan Rosario – Assistant Engineer
Tony Sheridan	 – Composer
 Joel Someillán – Engineer
Todd Sontag – Editing
Raúl Soto – Percussion
Ron Taylor – Organ
Ken Theis – Assistant Engineer
Lorenzo Torrez – Accordion
Nicolás Tovar – Composer, Vocal Producer
William Valdéz – Percussion
Dan Warner – Guitar
Ginny Warner – Video Producer
Diane Warren – Composer
Bruce Weeden – Engineer
Ryan Wolff – Assistant Engineer

Chart performance

Charts

Sales and certifications

References

2003 albums
Cristian Castro albums
Spanish-language albums
RCA Records albums
Albums produced by Emilio Estefan
Albums produced by Rudy Pérez